The 2006–07 Gamma Ethniki was the 24th season since the official establishment of the third tier of Greek football in 1983. Agios Dimitrios and Pierikos were crowned champions in South and North Group respectively, thus winning promotion to Beta Ethniki. ASK Olympiacos won the third promotion ticket after defeating Rodos 2-1 in a single play-off match at Municipal Ground of Peristeri between the two groups' second-placed teams.

Paniliakos, OF Ierapetra, PAO Varda, Zakynthos, Androutsos Gravia, Nafpaktiakos Asteras and Doxa Gratini were finally relegated to Delta Ethniki or the Regional Championship.

The highlight of the season was a match in penultimate round in which Apollon Smyrni's fans made serious incidents against Paniliakos. Therefore, were deducted 3 points and then was crucial to a relegation of Apollon to Delta Ethniki after many years of competing in the top leagues.

Southern Group

League table

Northern Group

League table

Play-off match

References 

Third level Greek football league seasons
3
Greece